The Department of Supply and Shipping was an Australian government department that existed between October 1942 and April 1948.

Scope
Information about the department's functions and/or government funding allocation could be found in the Administrative Arrangements Orders, the annual Portfolio Budget Statements and in the Department's annual reports.

The functions of the Department (in 1946) were:
The procurement of all supplies for the Services (other than arms, ammunition, ships and aircraft), and of certain other items for Commonwealth departments and overseas authorities.
The control of shipping, including:  
the best utilization of the Australian coastal fleet; 
the operation of Government-owned and chartered ships;   
Stevedoring labour and waterfront operations;   
the control of navigation service;   
the control and maintenance of coastal lights and aids to navigation
the operation of the Commonwealth Handling Equipment Pool.
The control of coal production and distribution.
The disposal of certain classes of Commonwealth property.
Oversight of the production of strategic minerals, metals and concentrates, the investigation and development of mineral resources, the conduct of geological and geophysical surveys, the search for oil and natural gas, and the development of Australia's fuel resources.
The control of the importation, allocation and use of various items in continuing world short supply, tinplate, petroleum, jute   and jute goods, and cordage and fibre.
The production of flax in Australia.
The control of Commonwealth Clothing Factory.

Structure
The Department was an Australian Public Service department, staffed by officials who were responsible to the Minister for Supply and Shipping, initially Jack Beasley (until February 1945) and subsequently Bill Ashley.

References

Transport in Australia
Supply and Shipping
Australia, Supply and Shipping
Shipping in Australia
1942 establishments in Australia
1948 disestablishments in Australia